Jiljilia may refer to:

Jaljulia, an Arab Israeli town
Jiljilyya, a Palestinian  town in the Ramallah and al-Bireh Governorate in the northern West Bank